The Diplomat Beach Resort Hollywood, Curio Collection by Hilton, is a beachfront resort located in Hollywood, Florida (Just South of Fort Lauderdale). The hotel has a North and a South Tower that have 1000 rooms and are 36 stories tall. The Diplomat has two pools, six restaurants and lounges, beachfront location and a convention center. The hotel is currently owned by Thayer Lodging Group and is operated under Hilton Worldwide

History
The Diplomat Hotel/Motel was opened in 1958. It was the only hotel in its time that was located between Miami and Fort Lauderdale. Grocery store magnate Samuel N. Friedland, who founded the Food Fair chain, opened the 150 room hotel named "The Envoy." He later expanded the hotel to 350 rooms and named it "The Diplomat." Soon, the Diplomat Hotel was a successful hotel in the Hollywood Area. Hollywood celebrities which include Bing Crosby, Maurice Chevalier, Woody Allen and more stayed at the Diplomat Hotel. Harry Truman also took visits to the Diplomat. In 1984, Bob Hope and Ronald Reagan visited the Diplomat as well. Due to financial problems, The Diplomat was closed and sold to the pension fund of the United Association of Journeymen and Apprentices of the Plumbing and Pipe Fitting Industry of the United States and Canada. The Diplomat was demolished in 1998.
Recently the hotel was renamed Diplomat Beach Resort

In 2002, the Westin Diplomat Resort and Spa, with 36 stories and 998 rooms, opened. It cost $187 million to build the Westin Diplomat.

On August 29, 2014, Thayer Lodging Group bought the Westin Diplomat Resort and Spa for $460 million and re-branded the hotel under the Curio  franchise.

References

 http://www.jumponmarkslist.com/us/fl/fll/hotels/diplomat-hotel-resort-hollywood-beach-florida.php -Evidence for History from Jump on Mark's List 
 http://www.edgeboston.com/index.php?ch=travel&sc=&sc2=news&sc3=&id=133394&hollywood_glamour_at_the_westin_diplomat_in_hollywood,_florida -Evidence for History from Edge Boston.
 http://www.miamiherald.com/news/business/article1984325.html -Evidence for Thayer and Hilton Hotels from the Miami Herald

Hotels in Florida
Hilton Hotels & Resorts hotels
Hollywood, Florida
Hotel buildings completed in 2002
2002 establishments in Florida